Toya Jones (born October 28, 1976) is a former American football defensive back.

Jones attended Refugio High School.

Most gold medals in Texas State track & field meet history at 14, winning 17 total

Jones was a member of the American 4 × 100 m relay squad at the 1994 World Junior Championships in Athletics.

Member of Texas A&M 4 × 100 m  relay National Champion team and All-American going undefeated at 12-0

References

External links
Birmingham Bolts bio
IAAF profile for Toya Jones

1976 births
Living people
American male sprinters
Texas A&M Aggies football players
Birmingham Thunderbolts players
BC Lions players
Houston Texans players
Toronto Argonauts players